The 1897 Yellow River flood was a major natural disaster during the late Qing dynasty in China.

After millennia of meandering north and south of the Shandong peninsula, the 1897 flood resulted in the course of the Yellow River generally followed to this day.

References

Disasters in Qing dynasty
Yellow River flood, 1897
Yellow River floods
Yellow River flood, 1897
1897 disasters in China